Sir Stuart Newton Hampshire  (1 October 1914 – 13 June 2004) was an English philosopher, literary critic and university administrator. He was one of the antirationalist Oxford thinkers who gave a new direction to moral and political thought in the post-World War II era.

Biography
Hampshire was born in Healing, Lincolnshire, the son of George Newton Hampshire, a fish merchant in nearby Grimsby. Hampshire was educated at Lockers Park School (where he overlapped with Guy Burgess), Repton School and Balliol College, Oxford, where he matriculated as a history scholar. He did not confine himself to history, switching instead to the study of Greats and immersing himself in the study of painting and literature. As was the culture at Balliol, his intellectual development owed more to his gifted contemporaries than to academic tutors. Having taken a first class degree, in 1936 he was elected to a Fellowship of All Souls College, Oxford, where he researched and taught philosophy initially as an adherent of logical positivism. He participated in an informal discussion group with some of the leading philosophers of his day, including J. L. Austin, H. L. A. Hart, and Isaiah Berlin.

In 1940, at the outbreak of World War II he enlisted in the army and was given a commission. Due to his lack of physical aptitude he was seconded to a position in military intelligence near London where he worked with Oxford colleagues such as Gilbert Ryle and Hugh Trevor-Roper. His encounters as interrogator with Nazi officers at the end of the war led to his insistence on the reality of evil.

After the war, he worked for the government before resuming his career in philosophy. From 1947 to 1950, he taught at University College London, and was subsequently a fellow of New College, Oxford. His study Spinoza was first published in 1951.  In 1955, he returned to All Souls, as a resident fellow and domestic bursar.

His innovative book Thought and Action (1959) attracted much attention, notably from his Oxford colleague Iris Murdoch. It propounded an intentionalist theory of the philosophy of mind taking account of developments in psychology. Although he considered most continental philosophy vulgar and fraudulent, Hampshire was much influenced by Maurice Merleau-Ponty. He insisted that philosophy of mind "has been distorted by philosophers when they think of persons only as passive observers and not as self-willed agents". In his subsequent books, Hampshire sought to shift moral philosophy from its focus on the logical properties of moral statements to what he considered the crucial question of moral problems as they present themselves to us as practical agents.

In 1960, Stuart Hampshire was elected a member of the British Academy and became Grote Professor of the Philosophy of Mind and Logic at University College London, succeeding A. J. Ayer. His international reputation was growing and from 1963 to 1970 he chaired the department of philosophy at Princeton University to which he had happily escaped from the robust atmosphere of London to which his mandarin style, conveyed in a rather preposterous growling accent, was ill-suited, as Ayer implied in his memoirs.  In 1970, he returned to Oxford as Warden of Wadham College, Oxford. His liberal and socialist views were apparent when Wadham was in the first group of men-only Oxford colleges to admit women in 1974. Hampshire considered his wardenship to be one of his most significant achievements in reviving the fortunes of the college. He was knighted in 1979 and retired from Wadham in 1984, when he accepted a professorship at Stanford University.

His last book, Justice Is Conflict (1999), inaugurated the Princeton Monographs in Philosophy series.

Stuart Hampshire wrote extensively on literature and other topics for The Times Literary Supplement and The New York Review of Books amongst others. He was head of the literary panel of the Arts Council for many years. In 1965–66, he was selected by the UK government to conduct a review of the effectiveness of GCHQ.

He married his first wife, Renée Ayer, the former wife of the philosopher A. J. Ayer, in 1961. She died in 1980, and in 1985 he married Nancy Cartwright, who was then his colleague at Stanford and is now Professor of Philosophy at Durham University and at the University of California, San Diego.

Publications 
 
  (The Mentor Philosophers.)
 
  (An inaugural lecture delivered at University College, London, 25 October 1960.)
 
 
 
  (Gwilym James Memorial Lecture.)
  (Thank-offering to Britain Fund Lecture.)

References

External links 

The Problem Of Nationalism a dialogue between Stuart Hampshire and Isaiah Berlin 
Isaiah Berlin’s obituary of Stuart Hampshire final draft and revised version as published in The Times.
 Professor Sir Stuart Hampshire Daily Telegraph obituary.
 Sir Stuart Hampshire obituary in The Independent.
 Memorial Resolution: Stuart Hampshire published in the Stanford Report
 Stuart Newton Hampshire 1914 - 2004 British Academy in memoriam
"I’m Going to Tamper with Your Beliefs a Little"; (1972) episode of "Logic Lane" in which Hampshire and Isaiah Berlin discuss philosophy in Oxford in the 1930s, and J. L. Austin

1914 births
2004 deaths
20th-century English philosophers
21st-century English philosophers
Academics of University College London
Action theorists
Alumni of Balliol College, Oxford
Analytic philosophers
British Army personnel of World War II
British consciousness researchers and theorists
European democratic socialists
English logicians
English male non-fiction writers
Epistemologists
Fellows of All Souls College, Oxford
Fellows of New College, Oxford
Fellows of the British Academy
Historians of philosophy
Intelligence Corps officers
Knights Bachelor
Metaphysicians
The New York Review of Books people
Ontologists
People educated at Repton School
People from the Borough of North East Lincolnshire
Philosophers of art
Philosophers of culture
Philosophers of education
Philosophers of history
Philosophers of law
Philosophers of literature
Philosophers of logic
Philosophers of mind
Social philosophers
Spinoza scholars
Spinozists
Stanford University Department of Philosophy faculty
Wardens of Wadham College, Oxford